Sunayana Fozdar is an Indian television actress. She had made her television debut in the show Santaan on Star Plus. She is currently playing the role of Anjali Taarak Mehta in the comedy show Taarak Mehta Ka Ooltah Chashmah on Sony SAB.

Filmography

Television

References

External links

Living people
Indian television actresses
Year of birth missing (living people)